North Clear Creek Falls is a waterfall in Hinsdale County, Colorado, located within the Rio Grande National Forest. North Clear Creek is a tributary of the Rio Grande. The waterfall flows over a deck of Nelson Mountain tuff, solidified ash from a volcano in the San Juan volcanic field that  erupted about 27 million years ago.

Overlook
An overlook area with a parking lot and a short trail is located about a half-mile from Colorado State Highway 149 on a paved county road. Visitors can observe and photograph the waterfall from the overlook site. It features picnic tables and a vault toilet. The site is wheelchair accessible and features a trail to the top of a nearby bluff.

References

Landforms of Hinsdale County, Colorado
Waterfalls of Colorado
Tourist attractions in Hinsdale County, Colorado
Rio Grande National Forest